This is a list of flag bearers who have represented Solomon Islands at the Olympics.

Flag bearers carry the national flag of their country at the opening ceremony of the Olympic Games.

See also
Solomon Islands at the Olympics

References

Solomon Islands at the Olympics
Solomon Islands
Flag